The 2011 Missouri River floods was a flooding event on the Missouri River in the United States.The flooding was triggered by record snowfall in Rocky Mountains of Montana and Wyoming along with near-record spring rainfall in central and eastern Montana. All six major dams along the Missouri River released record amounts of water to prevent overflow which led to flooding threatening several towns and cities along the river from Montana to Missouri; in particular Bismarck, North Dakota; Pierre, South Dakota; Dakota Dunes, South Dakota; South Sioux City, Nebraska, Sioux City, Iowa; Omaha, Nebraska; Council Bluffs, Iowa; Saint Joseph, Missouri; Kansas City, Missouri; Jefferson City, Missouri, and St. Louis, Missouri. Many smaller towns were also at risk, suffering the same fate as the larger cities if not worse. According to the National Weather Service, in the second half of the month of May 2011, almost a year's worth of rain fell over the upper Missouri River basin. Extremely heavy rainfall in conjunction with an estimated 212 percent of normal snowpack in the Rocky Mountains contributed to this flooding event.

Background

The flood, rather than being a short term event, was anticipated to last from June through August 2011 as a result of attempts by the Corps of Engineers to regulate the release of water through  of open river from Garrison Dam in North Dakota to the confluence with the Mississippi River at St. Louis. The Corps was criticized for not releasing the water earlier. However the Corps defended its practice noting that it did not foresee a cooler than normal spring which delayed the mountain snowmelt and the record sustained torrential spring rains in Wyoming and Montana.

In attempting to control the flood water release in since all the reservoirs were 100 percent or more of capacity (with the exception of the Fort Randall Dam), the Corps of Engineers doubled the record release of water in the river's five North and South Dakota dams.  Officials said that problems downstream could have been alleviated by river control work and new levee construction that came about in the wake of the Great Flood of 1993. However, they were unsure whether the levees could sustain being waterlogged in a long-term flood.
 
A study by Utah State University  examined the buildup of water storage leading to the 2011 Missouri River flooding  observed by GRACE satellites indicated that precipitation over the MRB undergoes a profound modulation during the transition points of the Pacific quasi-decadal oscillation and associated teleconnections. The results infer a prominent teleconnection forcing in driving the wet/dry spells in the MRB, and this connection implies persistence of dry conditions for the next 2 to 3 years, which is linked to the 2012-15 Midwestern drought.

Release of water by dam

In May 2011, dams above Gavins Point began stepping up the release of water (in cubic feet/second), exceeding all previous nationwide records for release.

Missouri River bridge closings

The flood forced the closing of several Missouri River traffic bridges from just above Gavins Point to northern Missouri. Authorities were also considering closing the Plattsmouth Bridge.

During the flood, every bridge between Omaha and Kansas City was either closed entirely, had exit ramps blocked or had other work at some point.

Long term closings
Chief Standing Bear Memorial Bridge between Nebraska and South Dakota near Niobrara, Nebraska. The bridge actually remained open but flooding on the Nebraska side made it a dead end. However some people (particularly employees at the Mike Durfee State Prison) used motor boats, kayaks, chest waders and a homemade “swamp bike” to commute between the bridge and their cars outside the flood area.
Burt County Missouri River Bridge (Mile 691) between Nebraska and Iowa near Decatur, Nebraska
Mormon Bridge (Mile 622) between Nebraska and Iowa north of Omaha, Nebraska (Interstate 680)
Bob Kerrey Pedestrian Bridge (Mile 616) – the pedestrian bridge between downtown Omaha and Council Bluffs which had been a popular viewing spot of the flood but was closed temporarily on June 30 while river debris was cleared from its base. The Council Bluffs side was closed on July 2 due to flooding on that side. It reopened September 3.
Nebraska City Bridge (Mile 561) between Nebraska and Iowa (near Nebraska City, Nebraska)
Brownville Bridge (Mile 535) between Nebraska and Missouri at Brownville, Nebraska
Rulo Bridge (Mile 497) between Nebraska and Missouri at Rulo, Nebraska
Amelia Earhart Bridge (Mile 422) between Kansas and Missouri at Atchison, Kansas. The bridge was open between Atchison and the small unincorporated community of Winthrop, Missouri, immediately across the bridge; however, access to Kansas City or St. Joseph on the Missouri side via U.S. Highway 59 was closed. Residents of Winthrop were evacuated on June 27.

Short term closings/interruptions
Blair Bridge (U.S. Route 30) (Mile 648) -- The bridge closed for June 27-July 1 while flood barriers were erected in Iowa. It was also closed again July 6–7 for further shoring up work.
Bellevue Bridge (Mile 602) – The bridge was closed June 27-July 2 due to flooding and sandbagging of Iowa Highway 370. Flooding in Haworth Park at the base of the bridge in Bellevue, Nebraska, had water up to the top of its basketball hoops on July 2.
Pony Express Bridge (Mile 448) – South bound exit in Elwood, Kansas, was closed temporarily on June 28 while storm water could be pumped off
Centennial Bridge (Leavenworth, Kansas) (Mile 396)- Scheduled resurfacing work on the bridge had started in May prior to the flood and traffic had been reduced to one lane. Since it was one of the few bridges open for traffic between Omaha and Kansas City, work on the bridge was halted indefinitely on July 1

Flood stages and effects by state

Montana

On May 22, 2011, flooding of the Little Bighorn River and nearby tributaries inundated Crow Agency and shut down Interstate 90 between Hardin and the Wyoming state line. May 26 flooding on Musselshell River inundated portions of Roundup. Waters from the Shields River entering the Yellowstone River created flooding that closed a portion of Interstate 90 from Livingston to Springdale. Flooding on Pryor Creek, another tributary of the Yellowstone River prompted closing of Pompeys Pillar National Monument.

North Dakota

On May 10 President Barack Obama declared much of North Dakota a disaster area over flooding which began on February 14 and had been continuing.

Some of the most dramatic flooding in North Dakota was on Souris River which comes close to the Missouri but is not a tributary as it flows instead north into the Assiniboine River in Canada, which also experienced prior flooding. 10,000 people in Minot were evacuated on June 1. On June 20 after they returned, officials announced that a new crest from new heavy rains would result in the river being a foot higher than the first crest. On June 21, 12,000 people, a quarter of the town's population, were ordered to evacuate after Lake Darling Dam had to step up its release of water. Amtrak suspended service on the Empire Builder through Minnesota, North Dakota and eastern Montana.

South Dakota

On June 1, nearly 3,000 people in Pierre and Fort Pierre were evacuated.

On June 3, South Dakota governor Dennis Daugaard urged residents in the Country Club section of Dakota Dunes (which is below Gavins Point Dam) to evacuate. He noted that it might be two months before they could return.

On June 21, South Dakota reported its first flood fatalities when two women drowned in Lyman County, South Dakota, after they drove their car down a washed out road. The fatalities were unrelated to flooding and increased releases on the Missouri River, but rather related to flash flooding from heavy rains according to the Lyman County Herald of Presho, S.D. 

On the same day Pierre, South Dakota, officials estimated costs from the flood would be $13.2 million for that community.

On June 30, the spillway at Big Bend Dam was temporarily closed for inspections.

Iowa
On June 10, the WinnaVegas Casino, which is owned by the Winnebago Tribe of Nebraska, near Sloan, was inaccessible. Shortly after, a yellow amphibious vehicle known locally as "the Duck" was used to provide transportation from Sloan across the floodwaters to the casino. The Duck now makes annual appearances as a float in Winnebago High School's homecoming parade.

On June 4, near River Mile 575 (near Hamburg), the main levee suffered a partial collapse. One June 5, it suffered a second partial collapse. On June 7, it suffered a third partial collapse. After the first partial collapse, the Corps of Engineers initiated an emergency contract to raise the levee immediately surrounding the town in order to protect it from an estimated  of flood water.

On June 22, a mandatory evacuation of all residents in Mills County between Interstate 29 and the Missouri River was declared.

On June 25, a levee breach north of Council Bluffs flooded an area of Harrison County which could impact U.S. Route 30 connecting Blair, Nebraska and Missouri Valley, Iowa. DeSoto National Wildlife Refuge was also impacted by the break in the levee.

On June 27, officials said water "could begin slopping" over the emergency levee at Hamburg on its west side. The Nishnabotna River on its east side was reported to be two feet above flood stage.

On July 1, the main levee near Percival (16 miles north of Hamburg) breached in the early morning hours adding to the flooded conditions from the Hamburg breach. The breach occurred despite a month-long battle by the local residents.

On July 1, the privately owned Vanmann #30 levee at Mile Marker 637 to 637.5 on the Iowa side, about 10 river miles south of the reactor, was blown up by the local levee authority. The levee destruction was done to alleviate flooding in a bend of the river where water was pooling on cropland and creating an enormous water pool directly opposite the reactor. Authorities initially reported a  rise in the river after the levee was blown. Both the US Army Corps of Engineers and the Iowa Department of Natural Resources said they did not regulate the levee. Flooding on the Iowa side had been a source of considerable concern after a June 25 levee breach upstream of the reactor near Missouri Valley, Iowa, prompted evacuations of 18 homes, temporary closing of the Blair Bridge (while flood walls were built to protect the Iowa approach) and closing of DeSoto National Wildlife Refuge on the DeSoto Bend. They had raised the levee height in anticipation of the flood but after the upstream breach they had sought permission to lower it so that water could flow back into the river. When both Iowa and the Corps said they did not have authority over it the levee board blew it up at approximately 10 a.m. on July 1. Pottawattamie County, Iowa, officials initially said they were notified only minutes prior to the levee being blown up, but those overseeing the levee had notified Harrison County, Iowa, officials earlier.

On July 1, the Corps reported that runoff on the river for June was the largest of any month on the river below Sioux City since record keeping began in 1898.

On July 11, officials at Sioux Gateway Airport said they were experiencing higher ticket sales. They speculated that the difficulty of driving from Sioux City and Omaha had spurred the increase.

As flood waters started to recede by late August, flood damage to Interstate highways 29 and 680 north of Council Bluffs, Iowa, was reported as extensive. Discounting the interstate system flood damage to county roads in Pottawattamie County alone was expected to amount to $40 million in repair costs.

Nebraska

On June 2, Scouts Rest Ranch, Buffalo Bill's home near the Platte River in North Platte, closed because of flood fears. Exhibits were moved and berms were built around the buildings. On July 13, officials said the flooding was not as severe as had been expected.

On June 4, Omaha city officials began releasing  of raw sewage per day into the river from its plant in South Omaha. The city generates about  a day, but only a small percentage is dumped into the river. The city of Omaha installed giant water pumps just east of Qwest Center Omaha to evacuate storm and sewer water directly into the Missouri River. By June 22, the city estimated 3 million dollars had been spent directly towards this flooding event.

On June 9, Nebraska reported its first event-related fatality when a worker was killed while working on a levee at Fort Calhoun when his truck tipped over.

The flooding affected the Fort Calhoun Nuclear Generating Station near Fort Calhoun, Nebraska, where the grounds of the plant were inundated by the flood, however, the plant had been in safe shutdown mode for refueling since April 2011. On June 7, a fire broke out in the plant's switch gear room, prompting the Nuclear Regulatory Commission to declare an "Alert", which is level 2 on the NRC's emergency classification. Officials for the plant's owner, the Omaha Public Power District (OPPD), were confident that enough redundancies were in place to ensure adequate safety. The helicopter was photographed lying on its side but there were no reports of injuries. Backup generators were then used to ensure the facility maintained electrical power for cooling. NRC officials were at the plant at the time and NRC statements said the plant remains safe. NRC Chairman Gregory Jaczko confirmed the plant's safety when he visited the plant on June 27.

At Cooper Nuclear Station, Nebraska Public Power District's (NPPD) nuclear plant near Brownville, a "Notification of Unusual Event" (the least-serious of the NRC emergency classifications) was issued on June 19 due to the flooding. Similar to the situation at Fort Calhoun, the FAA placed a temporary no-fly zone within  of the plant on June 7. Officials said, "There is no threat to plant employees or to the public; the plant continues to operate safely." At 9:47 a.m., July 12 the plant ended its emergency status because the river had dropped to 895.8 feet—3 feet lower than the emergency status level.

On June 27, officials said 12 of 70 planned dewatering wells at Eppley Airfield in Omaha were functional. The wells pump water collecting around the airport over the levee wall back into the Missouri River.

On June 29, Nebraska reported its first flood-related death when the body of a 26-year-old fisherman was found in the river near the Little Nemaha River at Nemaha.

On July 2, the Corps of Engineers awarded a $1.4 million contract to shore up the  levee system around Eppley Airfield with a seepage berm to allow water to seep through the levee but hold the levee materials in place. The action came after the Corps reported there were multiple sand boils on the airport side of the levee.

On July 3, Lindbergh Road which rings Eppley by the levees was closed so work could continue on 70 relief wells by the levees.

On July 5, the National Geospatial-Intelligence Agency reported that  of Nebraska has been inundated by floods on the Missouri and the Platte River. At the same time NASA released satellite photos of the flood from the Landsat 5 showing flooding from Blair to Plattsmouth to June 30.

On July 9, the Corps of Engineers said water behind the reservoirs had peaked on July 2 with only 1.5 percent left for flood storage. By July 9, the available storage increased to 3.1 percent. Officials said they planned to begin decreasing the water flowing to the Gavins Point Dam but noted that the water going into Gavins Point would fill it in 1.5 days if the reservoir were empty.

On July 11, the Omaha World-Herald quoted USGS researchers who are studying unique aspects of the flood. Among their discoveries:
 the flood water which is predominately coming from behind dams is clear rather than the traditional silt that gives the Missouri its Big Muddy nickname;

On July 13, OPPD said it had spent $26 million in June as a result of flooding affecting its power plants on the river ($20 million in work protecting its plants and $6 million in replacing lost generating capacity). OPPD has two coal-fired plants that are both larger than Fort Calhoun at Nebraska City. One of the rail lines providing coal was covered in water and the utility wanted to raise that track. The plants had been getting coal via a parallel line.

Missouri

On June 6, the Kansas City Corps of Engineers sent letters from its Real Estate Division to landowners along the river in northwest Missouri, telling them that through the Water Resources Development Act of 1986 via the Missouri River Bank Stabilization and Navigation Project and Missouri River Fish and Wildlife Mitigation Project that they were seeking willing sellers for land "for fish and wildlife habitat enhancements for aquatic species such as the pallid sturgeon." The letters arrived just as the floods began hitting their peak in Atchison County and subsequently were heavily criticized by state and federal politicians. The Corps reported that only 14 letters had been sent.

Interstate 29 closed in early June from Iowa Highway 2 (across the Missouri River from Nebraska City, Nebraska) to Rock Port, Missouri.

The United States Coast Guard closed the river to boaters from Gavins Point Dam (Mile Post 850) to Mile Post 450 near St. Joseph, Missouri.

Residents of Big Lake (which had evacuated during several floods including one in 2010) evacuated in May. Big Lake officials said the elevation would create a "bathtub" effect, trapping water in the community.

On June 19 a levee in Atchison County was breached and the levee protecting Big Lake was breached near Corning, Missouri, at Mile Marker 550. It prompted officials to close the two northernmost Missouri River bridges in the state, the Brownville Bridge (US 136) and the Rulo Bridge (US 159). The river had risen more than two feet in 24 hours in Atchison County. Officials said the surge in the river occurred when heavy rains in northern Iowa caused a major rise in the Nishnabotna River, which enters the Missouri River in Atchison County near Watson.

On June 21, 300 residents of Craig in Holt County were ordered to evacuate.

On June 24, Lewis and Clark State Park near Rushville closed.

On June 26 BNSF had to close its main rail line providing coal to Kansas City's Iatan Powerplant (via Rulo) after the river widened in Holt County to nearly 5+ miles by Big Lake.

On June 27 Terrible's St. Jo Frontier Casino riverboat casino closed. Levee toppings prompted the closure of Lewis and Clark Village, Missouri. Residents of the Sugar Lake area of Buchanan County were also under voluntary evacuation orders

On June 28 Squaw Creek National Wildlife Refuge in Holt County closed its tour route around its pools noting that it no longer control water levels in its pools and that it expects "critical habitat damage to our management areas including the moist soil units, wet prairie, and other priceless wildlife habitats and most habitats will be submerged."

On June 28, the Corps ordered Ameren to halt all outflows (including electrical generation) from Bagnell Dam on the Osage River until at least July 5.

On June 29, officials at Missouri's largest coal-fired power plant at Iatan, Missouri, sent 40 of its 135 employees home because of fears that the river would cut off its access on Missouri Route 45. Employees were parking a mile from the plant being shuttled in.

On June 30 the St. Joseph News-Press reported that residents of Holt County had dubbed the flood "Corpstrina" (pronounced Kor-TRINA) evoking the Corps of Engineers which regulates the river and the Hurricane Katrina disaster.

On July 2 Amtrak announced that two miles (3 km) of track between Kansas City and St. Louis was flooded between Myrick (west of Lexington) and Marshall. The railroad suspended the 311 and 316 trains of the Missouri River Runner but continued to maintain other traffic via trains rerouted to the Sedalia subdivision.

On July 3 a planned fireworks display in Richard Berkley Riverfront Park in Kansas City proceeded as planned and included the unveiling of a new lighting scheme on the Christopher Bond Bridge (Mile 365).

On July 4 St. Charles held its Riverfront fireworks display on the river—although moved back a block to Riverside Drive from Frontier Park.

Missouri National Guard Blackhawk helicopters were used to bring in 2,000 pound sand bags to reinforce the Sugar Tree levee in Carroll County, Missouri, near Mile 300 at Norborne after a third of the landside part of the levee slid.

On July 11 the Coast Guard closed the river above Glasgow, Missouri, at Mile 226 to navigation.

Kansas
On June 22, Leavenworth closed Sherman Army Airfield. On June 29 the levee was breached and water reached the hangars which had earlier been evacuated.

On Jun 29 the Elwood, Kansas, south bound exit ramp off the Pony Express Bridge was closed temporarily to pump water which had accumulated from rains. Elwood is also underwent voluntary evacuations. 200 National Guard troops were deployed to Doniphan County to assist in the evacuation. 400 of Elwood's 1,200 residents voluntarily evacuated.

The Amelia Earhart Bridge at Atchison had effectively closed on June 28. Closings of Missouri River bridges had been the result of flooding on the approaches and not the bridge itself. However, on June 29 photos began circulating that the low-lying Atchison Union Pacific rail bridge was close to water level. Union Pacific had embargoed its main rail line which goes between St. Joseph and Kansas City.

On July 1 the Corps of Engineers reported that every non-federal levee from Rulo to Wolcott, Kansas, in Wyandotte County, Kansas, on both sides of the river were either overtopped or breached. Included in the overtoppings was Kansas Department of Corrections land below the Lansing Correctional Facility at Lansing, Kansas. Another report indicated that the only overtopped federal levee was the one at Fort Leavenworth by Sherman Army Airfield.

References

External links

Spring 2011 Flood Information (Corps of Engineers - Omaha)
Spring 2011 Flood Information (Corps of Engineers - Kansas City)
MightyMoRiver crowd-sourced project (powered by Ushahidi)

Missouri River
2011
2011 in the United States